Dichonia is a genus of moths of the family Noctuidae. The genus was erected by Jacob Hübner in 1821.

Species
 Dichonia aeruginea (Hübner, [1808])
 Dichonia aprilina (Linnaeus, 1758) syn Griposia aprilina (Linnaeus, 1758)
 Dichonia chlorata Hampson, 1912
 Dichonia jahannamah (Fibiger, Stangelmaier, Wieser & Zahiri, 2008)
 Dichonia convergens (Denis & Schiffermüller, 1775)
 Dichonia pinkeri (Kobes, 1973)
 Dichonia skyvai  (Dvorak & Sumpich, 2010)
 Dichonia wegneri (Kobes & Fibiger, 2003)

References

Cuculliinae